Charles Alsop (24 November 1868 – 17 September 1948) was an Australian cricketer. He played one first-class cricket match for Victoria in 1894.

See also
 List of Victoria first-class cricketers

References

External links
 

1868 births
1948 deaths
Australian cricketers
Victoria cricketers
Cricketers from Melbourne
People from Moonee Ponds, Victoria